Manipa is an Austronesian language of eastern Indonesia. It is primarily spoken in the island of Manipa, which is located between Buru island and Seram island in the province of Maluku.

External links

Seram Island
Central Maluku languages
Languages of Indonesia